Antoine Robert Onslow "Tonny" van Lierop (19 September 1910 in Vught – 31 March 1982 in Blaricum) was a Dutch field hockey player who competed in the 1936 Summer Olympics.

He was a member of the Dutch field hockey team, which won the bronze medal. He played all five matches as halfback.

In 1928 he was a squad member of the Dutch field hockey team, but he did not compete.

References

External links
 
Tonny van Lierop: Profile

1910 births
1982 deaths
Dutch male field hockey players
Olympic field hockey players of the Netherlands
Field hockey players at the 1936 Summer Olympics
Olympic bronze medalists for the Netherlands
People from Vught
Olympic medalists in field hockey
Medalists at the 1936 Summer Olympics
20th-century Dutch people